After Eight Mint Chocolate Thins, often referred to as simply After Eights, are a brand of mint chocolate covered sugar confectionery. They were created by Rowntree Company Limited in the UK in 1962 and have been manufactured by Nestlé since its acquisition of Rowntree in 1988.

The mints were originally manufactured at Rowntree's York factory, before production transferred to Castleford, West Yorkshire, in 1970. For the UK market they are now manufactured in Halifax following Nestlé's closure of the Castleford factory in 2012. However on the limited edition 2020 casing it states "made in Germany, with sugar not solely of German origin". "More than 1bn After Eights, thin fondant mints, are made every year in the Castleford factory scheduled for closure in 2012 by the Switzerland-based confectionery giant."

After Eights were originally made from dairy-free dark chocolate. In 2002, however, Nestlé started adding butterfat to After Eights made at certain production facilities so as to increase resistance to chocolate bloom. This practice expanded to all production facilities in 2009. Nestlé has also made special editions of After Eights, including orange After Eights and milk chocolate After Eights.

Manufacturing 
The fondant in the centre of After Eights is made from a stiff paste of common sugar, water, and a small amount of the enzyme invertase. This fondant can readily be coated with dark chocolate. After manufacture, the enzyme gradually splits the common sugar into the much more soluble sugars glucose and fructose, resulting in a more liquid consistency. Maturing of the mint is said to take over three days. Once manufactured, each completed chocolate is packaged in a sheath and then loaded into a box.

Religious certification
 Certified kosher dairy by the Orthodox Union

Related products

Current products
The After Eight family of products includes:
 Thin Mints – The original After Eight product, these comprise square dark or (less commonly) milk chocolate, enclosing the mint fondant. There are also Limited Edition Thin Mints with added flavours such as orange, lemon, strawberry, cherry, blackcurrant, gin & tonic and others.
 Marzipan – Sold in Germany by Nestlé Deutschland AG
 Mint & Blood Orange – This variation on the thin mints was a special edition for Summer 2011. The flavour was reintroduced as Orange Mint in Autumn 2022.
 Delights – Round sweets of dark chocolate with a mint fondant filling.
 Straws – Long, thin sticks of soft dark chocolate with a mint fondant filling.
 Bars – Dark chocolate bar with a creamy mint centre.
 Biscuits – The newest addition to the After Eight family, these combine dark chocolate with mint in a biscuit.
 Chocolate Santa Claus – During the Christmas season, Nestlé Germany features a 125g Santa Claus made out of white or dark mint chocolate.
 Easter bunny – During Easter time Nestlé releases an After Eight Dark Chocolate Easter Bunny. It does not have a mint filling but is made from peppermint flavoured chocolate and comes in the well known After Eight green wrapping
 Bitesize – Plain chocolate with mint fondant filling, similar in appearance to original Munchies. Originally known as Mintola, then renamed Mint Munchies in 1995, before being brought under the After Eight brand in 2006.
 Mousse – A chilled dessert consisting of mint mousse with layers of dark chocolate
 Dessert – A chilled smooth mint and chocolate flavoured dessert
 Strawberry and Mint – This variation on the thin mints was a special edition for Spring/Summer 2020.

Discontinued products
 Chocolate Truffle Pancakes
 Dark Chocolate Fairy Cakes
 Ice Cream Van
 Lemon Sorbet

Other related products
 A silver plated 'After 8 Mint' Royal Coach (Mints not supplied) novelty table holder was available from Argos in the UK in the 1980s 
 Pfefferminz – A variety of Ritter Sport which has similar taste to the original After Eight, in the shape of a Ritter Sport.
 After Eight (cocktail) – A layered shooter consisting of Crème de cacao, Crème de menthe and Baileys Irish Cream.
 Royal Mints – A product manufactured by Halloren very similar to After Eight.
 Mint Nights – A product manufactured for Poundland very similar to After Eight.
 After Dinner Mints – an Australian product which was similar to After Eights. The manufacturer, Red Tulip, was bought out in the 1980s by Cadbury.

Notes

External links

 

Rowntree's brands
Brand name confectionery
Chocolate confectionery
Nestlé brands
1962 establishments in England
Products introduced in 1962
British confectionery
Kosher food